Nadezhda Radovitskaya (born 20 November 1977) is a Russian freestyle skier. She competed in the women's moguls event at the 1998 Winter Olympics.

References

1977 births
Living people
Russian female freestyle skiers
Olympic freestyle skiers of Russia
Freestyle skiers at the 1998 Winter Olympics
Sportspeople from Saint Petersburg